Arjun Rai (b. Khalle, Khotang district) is a Nepalese politician, belonging to the Rastriya Janshakti Party. He is an Alternative Central Committee of RJP. Rai has an M.A. in English. He had joined Nepali Congress in 1979, but later joined the pro-panchayat Nepal Youth Organization. He was the Khotang district chairman of the organization 1986–1989. In 1990 he joined the Rastriya Prajatantra Party. During some periods he served as Khotant district chair of the party. When RPP split in 2005, he joined the RJP. After the 2008 Constituent Assembly election he became a Constituent Assembly member.

References

Living people
People from Khotang District
Rastriya Janashakti Party politicians
Nepali Congress politicians from Koshi Province
Year of birth missing (living people)
Members of the 1st Nepalese Constituent Assembly